Dorrian Commons Park was a park and part of the Franklin County Government Center in downtown Columbus, Ohio, United States. The park opened in 1976 on the site of the first and second Franklin County Courthouse, built in 1887. Dorrian Commons closed in 2018, pending construction of a new courthouse.

History

The second Franklin County Courthouse, built in 1887, stood on the site until its demolition in 1974. The park opened in 1976.

The park has a metal sculpture by an unknown artist. A large cast of Henry Moore's Oval with Points was originally installed in Dorrian Commons Park.  The sculpture was moved across High Street in 2014 to the plaza of the newly remodeled Hall of Justice of the Franklin County Government Center.

The park is scheduled to be demolished and replaced by a county municipal courthouse. The adjacent James A. Karnes Building is to be repurposed or demolished as well. The park fountain was turned off in August 2018. The underutilized park was closed off in December 2018. It had also been scheduled to be demolished in 2003, to be replaced with the common pleas courthouse, a project moved and built north of the government center complex.

References

External links

 
 

1976 establishments in Ohio
2018 disestablishments in Ohio
Downtown Columbus, Ohio
Former parks in the United States
Parks in Columbus, Ohio